The 2021 Gran Canaria Challenger II was a professional tennis tournament played on clay courts. It was the second edition of the tournament which was part of the 2021 ATP Challenger Tour. It took place in Las Palmas, Spain between 1 and 7 March 2021.

Singles main-draw entrants

Seeds

1 Rankings as of 22 February 2021.

Other entrants
The following players received wildcards into the singles main draw:
  Carlos Alcaraz
  Carlos Gimeno Valero
  Nikolás Sánchez Izquierdo

The following player received entry into the singles main draw as an alternate:
  Javier Barranco Cosano

The following players received entry from the qualifying draw:
  Eduard Esteve Lobato
  Filip Cristian Jianu
  Emilio Nava
  Giulio Zeppieri

The following player received entry as a lucky loser:
  Sandro Ehrat

Champions

Singles

 Carlos Gimeno Valero def.  Kimmer Coppejans 6–4, 6–2.

Doubles

 Enzo Couacaud /  Manuel Guinard def.  Javier Barranco Cosano /  Eduard Esteve Lobato 6–1, 6–4.

References

2021 ATP Challenger Tour
2021 in Spanish tennis
March 2021 sports events in Spain